Creevey is a surname and may refer to:

 Alo Creevey, fictional character from the third generation of the British teen drama Skins
 James Creevey (1840–1877), birth name of James H. Morgan, Union Navy sailor in the American Civil War and a recipient of the Medal of Honor
 James Creevey (chess player) (1873–1967), Irish chess player
 Thomas Creevey (1768–1838), English politician known for his papers published in 1903

See also
 Shane Creevey of D-Side, Irish boyband established in 2001, by twins Rory and Eoghan MacSweeney
 The Creevey Brothers (Colin and Dennis Creevey), fictional characters in J. K. Rowling's Harry Potter series of books